Robert Raj is an Indian choreographer and actor who has worked in across India's several regional film industries. He has also appeared as an actor, often portraying villainous roles or by making cameo appearances in songs he has choreographed.

Career
Robert began his career as a child artiste, notably playing Mammooty's son in Azhagan (1991). Robert then featured as a villain in films, with major acting roles in Sathyaraj's Maaran (2002) and the 2004 film Dancer, which told the story of a disabled student making it successful as a dancer. Portraying the antagonist, Robert won critical acclaim for his portrayal and secured the Tamil Nadu State Film Award for Best Villain later that year. In the period, he also featured in Pavalakodi (2003), with reviewers criticizing his performance, noting Robert "struggles to emote and even potentially funny dialogues lose their effect because of his dialogue delivery".

Robert won the Vijay Award for Best Choreographer for his work in Podaa Podi (2012), in which he also made a cameo appearance in the video of "Love Panlamma?".

Prior to the release of the film Motta Shiva Ketta Shiva (2017), actor Tinku released a video alleging that composer Amresh Ganesh had stolen a song titled "Hara Hara Mahadevaki" from a film that he and Robert were making titled Thaathaa Car-ai Thodadhae. Tinku alleged that Amresh had worked together with them to create the song during early 2015, but production troubles had shelved the film and subsequently Amresh had taken the song to a different project. In a press meet in February 2017, Amresh Ganesh refuted the claims and provided evidence of Tinku and Robert continuously trying to scam him by gathering funds for the shelved project. Amresh stated that he had developed the song free of cost and had paid for the duo to take part in a failed shoot of the song in Bangkok, before the film was stalled. Moreover, Amresh revealed that Robert had owned up to playing the song to music composer Srikanth Deva, and had attempted to include it in another shelved film titled Minor Kunju Kaanom which Tinku, Robert and Srikanth Deva were involved in.

Personal life
Robert's elder sister Alphonsa, has also appeared in Tamil films.

Filmography

Television

References

Indian film choreographers
Male actors from Chennai
Tamil film directors
20th-century Indian male actors
Male actors in Tamil cinema
Male actors in Malayalam cinema
Bigg Boss (Tamil TV series) contestants
Living people

1981 births